The 2013 season of the National League, the third tier of British speedway was contested by eight teams.

Summary
Scunthorpe Saints and Rye House Cobras were missing from 2012, and replaced by Coventry Storm and Kent Kings.

The Dudley Heathens were champions.

Final table
 PL = Matches; W = Wins; D = Draws; L = Losses; Pts = Total Points

Scoring system:
Home loss by any number of points = 0
Home draw = 1
Home win by between 1 and 6 points = 2
Home win by 7 points or more = 3
Away loss by 7 points or more = 0
Away loss by 6 points or fewer = 1
Away draw = 2
Away win by between 1 and 6 points = 3
Away win by 7 points or more = 4

Playoffs
Top four teams race off in two-legged semi-finals and final to decide the championship. Dudley Heathens defeated King's Lynn Young Stars in the final.

Semi-finals

Final

National League Knockout Cup
The 2013 National League Knockout Cup was the 16th edition of the Knockout Cup for tier three teams. Dudley Heathens were the winners.

First round

Semi-finals

Final

Final leading averages

Teams and final averages

Buxton Hitmen
Charles Wright 10.37
Tony Atkin 7.75
Liam Carr 6.87
Adam McKinna 6.22
Lee Smart 5.76
Ryan Blacklock 4.43
Tom Woolley 3.64
Matt Williamson 3.33
Tyler Govier 3.00

Coventry Storm
Joe Jacobs 8.71
Robert Branford 8.53
James Sarjeant 7.38
Oliver Greenwood 6.89
Richard Franklin 4.84
Luke Crang 4.78
Trevor Heath 4.18
James Shanes 3.46
Martin Knuckey 3.00
Tommy Fenwick 3.00

Dudley Heathens
Lewis Blackbird 10.49
Paul Starke 9.93
Ashley Morris 8.83
Max Clegg 6.27
Dan Greenwood 5.74
Gareth Isherwood 4.57
Nathan Greaves 4.00

Isle of Wight Islanders
Adam Ellis 8.90
Byron Bekker 7.44
Ben Hopwood 6.89
Tom Perry 6.30
Darryl Ritchings 5.94
Brendan Johnson 4.84
Danny Stoneman 4.29
Chris Widman 3.50
Brandon Freemantle 3.00

Kent Kings
Steve Boxall 9.56
Ben Morley 7.13
David Mason 6.38
Jack Kingston 4.20
Connor Coles 3.67
Adam Kirby 3.00
Sam Woods 3.00

King's Lynn Young Stars
Robert Lambert 10.30
Lewis Kerr 8.22
Jake Knight 7.62
Lewis Rose 6.76
James Cockle 6.24
Shane Hazelden 4.77
Scott Campos 4.56
Shane Waldron 3.00

Mildenhall Fen Tigers
Stefan Nielsen 8.00
Jon Armstrong 7.93
Josh Bates 7.49
Danny Halsey 7.43
Aaron Baseby 4.56
Nathan Stoneman 3.35
Liam Rumsey 3.05

Stoke Potters
Ben Reade 7.70
Steve Worrall 7.09
Tom Young 7.04
Kyle Hughes 6.22
Lee Payne 4.90
Luke Priest 4.75
Luke Chessell 4.22
Shaun Tedham 3.00
Emerson Jones 3.00

Development Leagues

Midland Development League

Northern Junior League

See also
 List of United Kingdom Speedway League Champions

References

Speedway National League
Speedway National League
Speedway National League